Horace G. Notice (born 7 August 1957 in West Bromwich) is an English  amateur and professional heavyweight boxer of the 1980s who as an amateur won the 1983 ABA Heavyweight Championship boxing out of the Nechells Green ABC (Birmingham.

As a professional, Notice won the British Boxing Board of Control (BBBofC) British heavyweight title, and Commonwealth heavyweight title, his professional fighting weight varied from 196 lb, to 212 lb. After defending both his British and Commonwealth heavyweight titles against Hughroy Currie, a retinal detachment prematurely ended his boxing career, and ruined his plans of a next defence. Horace said; "his only regrets were not fighting for a EBU title and facing the man that Frank Bruno avoided, David Pearce".

Personal life
Notice lives in Hayes, South East London, with the actress Jacqui Gordon-Lawrence and their daughters, Naomi and Amelia. Singer and actress Michelle Gayle is godmother to one of their daughters.

Professional boxing record

References

External links

Image - Horace Notice 
Article - Fight night in great tradition

1957 births
Living people
Cruiserweight boxers
Heavyweight boxers
English male boxers
Sportspeople from West Bromwich
Boxers from Birmingham, West Midlands
England Boxing champions